Kimiyo Mishima (born 1932) is a contemporary Japanese artist, best known for creating highly realistic versions of "breakable printed matter" in ceramic such as newspapers, comic books and boxes out of clay. Mishima began her artistic career as a painter in the early 1960s, then started working in ceramics in 1971. At this time, she began to use the silk screen technique to print newspaper and ad poster images onto clay. Her use of manufactured objects shows parallels with the works of Claes Oldenburg and Andy Warhol, as well as postwar Japanese collectives Gutai and Dokuritsu Art Association.

Early life
Mishima was born in 1932 in the Juso district, a downtown area of Osaka City. Her family owned a liquor store, so she grew up relatively well off.

Mishima took lessons in Nihon-Buyo, classical Japanese dance, but her teacher often scolded her for making up her choreography. She said she wanted to dance like Mercier Cunningham, the famous American modern dancer, "but my teacher would get angry. I realized that to dance, you need music and that if I wanted to do something alone, it could probably only be art."

As a child, Mishima was not one to play with dolls. Her father bought her several microscopes, and she often used them to look at her hair and insects. She would often crush bugs and put them under the microscope to observe.

In middle school, her homeroom teacher happened to be her art teacher and encouraged her to pursue art and draw things not taught in the art classroom. So her father bought her a set of painting materials, and she immersed herself in her painting from a young age.

After graduating high school, she had wanted to go to university to become a doctor, but her mother forced her into an early marriage in hopes that it would help her settle down. But she ran away to Tokyo from that marriage in about a year.

Artistic influences and career 
She eventually married Shigeji Mishima, who had followed her to Tokyo from Osaka. Shigeji was a family friend whose mother was the midwife of Mishima's mother. Mishima was encouraged to visit Shigeji from a young age because he was an artist. Mishima was reticent, but they eventually developed a reciprocating relationship through their art.

Shigeji was an artist who studied under Jiro Yoshihara, a painter deeply involved in the Gutai movement. Due to Shigeji's influence, Mishima's work shifted from figurative painting to abstraction.

Through Shigeji, Mishima interacted with other Japanese artists like Jiro Yoshihara, Takesada Matsutani, and Shuji Mukai. She was also old acquaintances with architect Tadao Ando and the dancer Toru Takemitsu. Although she was invited to join the Gutai group, she refused because she preferred to work alone and did not identify with the core Gutai artists from Osaka's well-off Ashiya area.

In the 1960s, she started making collages with newspapers, discarded waste papers from printing companies, and old movie posters. Mishima said that she didn't have much money at the time, so she turned her attention to these kinds of materials. She would use printed and other materials, such as a blanket that her husband's brother used as a soldier during World War II.

As the materials she used for her collages accumulated in her studio, she came upon the idea to make her iconic newspaper-shaped ceramics in the 1970s. At first, she had trouble making the clay thin enough to imitate the form of the newspaper. She got the idea to use a rolling pin when she saw an Udon-making demonstration. She had used silk screen techniques in her collages for years, which helped her develop a method to transfer the text of newspapers onto the ceramics. Mishima would choose articles or advertisements from various Japanese newspapers on topics that interested her. She often used cutouts from the New York Times or Playbills from Broadway shows that she went to during her time in New York, from 1986 to 1987, supported by a grant by the Rockefeller Grant. She was invited to join the Sodeisha ceramics movement, but she never considered herself a ceramicist, so she did not join.

She said, "I thought that if I changed the newspaper's paper into ceramics, it might express a sense of impending crisis or instability regarding 'information'." She said that she chose ceramics because of their brittle quality and newspapers because they symbolized the commodification of information. Her works seem to be a social commentary about the acceleration of consumption in the information age.

Selected solo exhibitions

Selected group exhibits

Permanent Installations, Museum and Public collections
The National Museum of Modern Art, Kyoto, JP

Kyoto Municipal Museum of Art, Kyoto, JP

The International Museum of Art, Osaka, JP

Benesse Art Site Naoshima, Naoshima, JP

Hara Museum of Art, Tokyo, JP

The Metropolitan Museum of Art, Tokyo, JP

Hokkaido Prefectural Museum of Modern Art, Sapporo, JP

The Museum of Art, Hakodate, JP

Iwaki City Museum of Modern Art, Fukushima, JP

Tochigi Prefectural Museum of Art, JP

Okegawa City Park, Saitama, JP

Matsumoto City Museum of Art, Matsumoto, JP

The Gifu Prefectural Contemporary Ceramic Museum of Art, Gifu, JP

The Wakayama Prefectural Modern Museum of Art, Wakayama, JP

The Shigaraki Ceramic Cultural Park, Shiga, JP

The Hyogo Prefectural Museum of Art, Kobe, JP

Ashiya City Museum of Art and History, Ashiya, Hyogo, JP

Takamatsu City Museum of Art, Takamatsu, Kagawa, JP

Yamaguchi Prefectural Museum of Art, Yamaguchi, JP

Hamada Children’s Museum of Art, Hamada, Shimane, JP

Ikeda Museum of 20th Century Art, Ikeda, Shizuoka, JP

Contemporary Art Museum ISE, Mie, JP

Ohara Museum of Art, Okayama, JP

The Japan Foundation, Tokyo, JP

The Korean Culture & Arts Foundation Seoul, KR

Institute of Contemporary Art, Kunsan National University, KR

National Museum of History, TW

HAP POTTERY, Beijing, CN

M+ Museum, Hong Kong, HK

Art Institute of Chicago, Chicago, USA

Minneapolis Institute of Arts, Minneapolis, USA

The Everson Museum of Art, New York, USA

Samuel P. Harn Museum of Art, University of Florida, Gainesville Florida, USA

The First National Bank of Chicago, USA

Asian Cultural Council, New York, USA

SMITH COLLEGE, Northampton, USA

Worcester Art Museum, Worcester, USA

Museum of  Fine Arts, St. Petersburg, Florida, USA

The Keramion Museum for Contemporary Ceramic Art, DE

The Museum of Faenza, IT

Japanese Culture Center, Roma, IT

Ariana Museum, Geneve, CH

Kunst Gesellschaft, Spiez, CH

The Museum of Art, Olot, ES

International Ceramics Studio, Kecskemét, HU

Musee Cernoschi, Paris, FR

Vehbi Koç Foundation, ARTER, Istanbul, TR

Awards

References

External links
 Official website

1932 births
Living people
20th-century Japanese women artists
21st-century Japanese women artists
21st-century ceramists
Japanese women painters
Japanese ceramists
Japanese painters
Japanese contemporary artists
Abstract artists
Japanese conceptual artists
Women conceptual artists
People from Osaka
Japanese women ceramists